Cerović is a surname. Notable people with the surname include:

Ivan Cerović (born 1982), Croatian tennis player
Miloš Cerović (born 1980), Serbian swimmer
Novica Cerović (1805–1895), Montenegrin noble
Srđan Cerović (born 1971), Serbian footballer and manager
Stojan Cerović (1949–2005), Serbian journalist

Serbian surnames